WJF may refer to:

World Juggling Federation
General William J. Fox Airfield, (IATA airport code: WJF), a public airport in Lancaster, California